Tarafdaar (Persian طرفدار in English On Your Side) is a studio album by major Iranian pop artist Shadmehr Aghili released in 2012.

Track listing

References

2012 albums
Shadmehr Aghili albums